Gopeng Baru Jamek Mosque is a community mosque located off Jalan Gopeng (Gopeng Road) in the town of Gopeng, Kampar District, Perak, Malaysia.

Description
It was built to provide larger space for the local Muslims to pray particularly Friday prayers due to the insufficient of space in the previous Masjid Jamek Gopeng. Furthermore, the convenient location of the mosque and its more proper space planning make it the right decision for many to hold religious activities at this mosque instead of the old mosque.

Earlier, there was no minaret built for the mosque. However, a minaret was built to complete the mosque after a very long halt. A cendol kiosk will be around weekly for the Friday prayers. The only disadvantages of the whole project are the exit point from the compound is excessively narrow and extremely congested during Friday prayers and there are no proper zebra crossings for people to cross the road. It is dangerous for pedestrians, particularly the Gopeng senior folks.

References

Mosques in Perak
Kampar District